The 1989–90 season was the 74th season of competitive association football and 63rd season in the Football League played by Crystal Palace Football Club, a professional football club based in Selhurst, South London, England. Their promotion via the Second Division play-offs in 1988–89 meant they played in the First Division, after an eight-year absence from the top division of the English football league system. The season ran from 1 July 1989 to 30 June 1990.

It was Steve Coppell's sixth start to a season as manager. Palace occupied a position in the bottom half of the table for most of the season, and finished the 1989–90 Football League First Division in 15th place. The club suffered its record league defeat this season when Liverpool beat them 9–0 at Anfield. Palace reached the 1990 FA Cup final at Wembley Stadium, they drew 3–3 with Manchester United and so the tie had to be replayed five days later, United won 1–0 to give Alex Ferguson his first major trophy as their manager. Palace were eliminated from the 1989–90 Football League Cup in the third round, and from the 1989–90 Full Members' Cup in the Southern section final.

23 players made at least one appearance in nationally organised first-team competition, and there were 12 different goalscorers. Midfielders Andy Gray, Alan Pardew and Geoff Thomas played in 51 of the 54 competitive matches played over the season; Gray started all 51 while Pardew and Thomas made 2 and 4 substitute appearances respectively. Mark Bright finished as leading scorer with 17 goals, of which 12 came in league competition, two came in the FA Cup, one came in the League Cup and two came in the Full Members' Cup. Bright was voted as the Crystal Palace F.C. Player of the Year.

Background and pre-season

The 1988–89 season was Palace's eight successive season in the Football League Second Division. They finished the season in third place missing out on the second automatic promotion place by one point, instead they qualified for the play-offs. They beat Swindon Town in the semi-final 2–1 on aggregate. In the 1989 Football League Second Division play-off final they faced Blackburn Rovers, the first leg was won by Rovers 3–1 at Ewood Park. In the second leg at Selhurst Park, Palace were 2–0 up after 90 minutes so the match went into extra time. Another goal from Palace saw them win the tie and take the remaining place in the First Division.

League table

Results

First Division

FA Cup

League Cup

Full Members' Cup

Squad

Notes

References 
General
 
Specific

Crystal Palace F.C. seasons
Crystal Palace F.C.